Rovaniemen maalaiskunta was a municipality of Finland. It merged with the city of Rovaniemi on January 1, 2006.

It was located in the province of Lapland. The municipality had a population of 21,803 and covered an area of 7,915.51 km² of which 409.06 km² was water. The population density was 2.9 inhabitants per km².

The municipality surrounded the town of Rovaniemi. In 2004 the two municipalities decided to unite into one municipality. The new municipality was formed on January 1, 2006 with the name Rovaniemen kaupunki (the city of Rovaniemi). The new municipality has a population of approximately 57,000. With an area of 7,900 km² it is the largest city in Finland and Europe. 

Rovaniemi
Populated places disestablished in 2006
Former municipalities of Finland